Brian Allen may refer to:

Brian Allen (wide receiver) (born 1962), gridiron football wide receiver for the Edmonton Eskimos of the Canadian Football League
Brian Allen (linebacker) (born 1978), American football linebacker for the St. Louis Rams, Carolina Panthers and Washington Redskins
Brian Allen (running back) (born 1980), American football running back for the Indianapolis Colts and San Francisco 49ers
Brian Allen (cornerback) (born 1993), American football cornerback
Brian Allen (offensive lineman) (born 1995), American football offensive lineman
Brian Allen (musician), Canadian musician, songwriter and producer; co-wrote "What About Love", popularized by Heart
Brian Allen (art historian), British art historian

See also
Bryan Allen (disambiguation)
Bryon Allen (born 1992), American basketball player
Allen (surname)